Nicolae Grigorescu is a metro station in Bucharest. It is named after the Romanian painter Nicolae Grigorescu, and shares this name with the nearby boulevard, Bd. Nicolae Grigorescu. Before 1990, it was known as Leontin Sălăjan, after a Communist Army General.

The station was opened on 28 December 1981 as part of the second phase of Line 1 between Timpuri Noi and Republica. On 20 November 2008, the extension to Linia de Centură (now Anghel Saligny) was constructed, and a shuttle started operating between Nicolae Grigorescu and Anghel Saligny. The regular operation started on 4 July 2009.

Extension
An extension to Line M1/M3 connects Nicolae Grigorescu to Anghel Saligny. The extension has been open since 20 November 2008.

References

External links 
 

Bucharest Metro stations
Railway stations opened in 1981
1981 establishments in Romania